Krista Anne Errickson (born May 8, 1964) is an American actress, journalist, and documentary filmmaker, writer and producer who appeared in films and television productions in the 1980s and 1990s. As a teen  actress, she is most recognized for her role as teen antagonist Cinder in the 1980 movie Little Darlings and the TV series Hello, Larry. As an adult, she is best known for her work as a journalist with RAI (RadioTelevisioneItaliana).

Early life and education
Krista Errickson was born in Abington, Pennsylvania. She is the granddaughter of Broadway set designer Jo Mielziner. Errickson is a goddaughter of director, writer, and  producer Elia Kazan.

Professional life
She began acting in 1978 and is a lifetime member of the Actors Studio.

As a teenager, Errickson began appearing in television and film projects. She replaced Donna Wilkes in the role of Diane Alder on the second season of the TV series Hello, Larry and on four episodes of Diff'rent Strokes.

Errickson continued acting until 1994, appearing in movies and guest starring in shows such as Fame, Mr. Belvedere, 21 Jump Street, and Beverly Hills, 90210.

Her journalism career began at RAI's Channel 1 in Rome before becoming a host for RAI International and RAISAT. She became senior producer and journalist reporting on current events and international politics, with a focus on Middle East relations. Some of her more well-known programs were The Yellowcake Uranium Scandal, RAWA’s Meena: The Story of a Revolutionary, and In the Name of God, about Iran’s Islamic fundamentalism.

She was the first female journalist to interview Sheikh Nasrallah (for her documentary, Inside the Hezbollah, which later became the subject of a book she co-authored). For CBS and the Discovery Channel, she was co-executive producer for The Mysterious Man of The Shroud; The Genetic Revolution, a four-part series which in part exposed secret genetic experiments that were conducted by Monsanto Corporation; The Science of Human Cloning, and the program, Inside The Vatican.

In 2007, she was part of a team sent to Pakistan and Afghanistan, successfully negotiating the release of a kidnapped Italian journalist from the Taliban. In 2008, she successfully aided a recently released political prisoner leave Iran and return to the United States.

Filmography
Diff'rent Strokes (TV series; 1979; 4 episodes) as Diane Alder
Hello, Larry (TV series; 1979–80) as Diane Alder
Little Darlings (1980) as Cinder
Making the Grade (TV series; 1982; 1 episode)
Jekyll and Hyde... Together Again (1982) as Ivy
Fame (TV series; 1982; 1 Episode) as Diana
The First Time (1982 TV movie) as Karen
The Powers of Matthew Star (TV series; 1982; 1 episode) as Lisa
Deadly Lessons (1983 TV movie) as Tember Logan
The First Time (1983) as Dana
The Best of Times (TV series; 1983) as Robin Dupree
The Doors: Dance on Fire (Video; 1985; "L.A. Woman" segment)
The New Gidget (TV series; 1986; 1 episode) as Karen
Mr. Belvedere (TV series; 1988; 1 episode) as Amy Nelson
Tour of Duty (TV series; 1989; 2 episodes) as Stacy Bridger
Mama's Family (TV series; 1989; 1 episode) as Bunny Vanderhaus
21 Jump Street (TV series; 1989; 1 episode) as Christine
Mortal Passions (1990)) as Emily
Killer Image (1992) as Shelley
Beverly Hills, 90210 (TV series; 1992; 3 episodes) as Maggie
Martial Outlaw (Direct-to-video; 1993) as Lori White
Jailbait (Direct-to-video; 1993) as Merci Cooper
The Paperboy (1994) as Diana
MLK: A Life (RAI; 1996) - executive producer, writer
The Genetic Revolution (RAI; 1996) - executive producer, writer
In The Name of God (RAI; 1997) - executive producer, co-producer, writer
Mysterious Man of the Shroud (CBS; 1998)
You2: The Science of Human Cloning (RAI; 2000) - executive producer, writer
Inside The Hezbollah (RAI; 2000) - executive producer, writer
 Inside The Vatican (RAI; 2001) - executive producer, writer
RAWA's Meena: The Story of a Revolutionary (RAI; 2002) - executive producer, writer
The Yellowcake Uranium Scandal (RAI; 2005) - executive producer, writer
I Am Iran (RAI; 2009) - executive producer, writer

References

External links
 

Living people
American film actresses
20th-century American actresses
American women writers
Italian journalists
American television actresses
People from Abington Township, Montgomery County, Pennsylvania
Actresses from Pennsylvania
American child actresses
1964 births
21st-century American women